Chamran may refer to:

people
 Mostafa Chamran
 Mehdi Chamran

places
 Chamran, Iran, a city in Khuzestan Province, Iran
 Chamran, Behbahan, a village in Khuzestan Province, Iran
 Chamran, Markazi, a village in Markazi Province, Iran
 Chamran Expressway in Tehran, Iran
 Chamran Grand Hotel, in Shiraz, Iran
 Chamran University of Ahvaz, in Ahvaz, Iran